Olšany refers to the following places in the Czech Republic:

 Olšany (Jihlava District)
 Olšany (Klatovy District)
 Olšany (Šumperk District)
 Olšany (Vyškov District)
 Olšany u Prostějova